The 5th constituency of the Haut-Rhin is a French legislative constituency in the Haut-Rhin département.

Description

The constituency is composed almost entirely by the city of Mulhouse with only the addition of the Canton of Habsheim to the east beyond its immediate boundaries.

Unlike other constituencies in Haut-Rhin the 5th has returned left-wing candidates on no less than four occasions. However, from 2002 to 2022 it was held by the centre-right, before being won by Emmanuel Macron's centrist Ensemble Citoyens alliance.

Historic Representation

Election results

2022

 
 
|-
| colspan="8" bgcolor="#E9E9E9"|
|-
 

 
 
 
 
 

* In the previous election, Becht was an independent centre-right candidate supported by LR. Swing calculations are based on parties and alliances, with Becht's 2017 results counted against the 2022 LR candidate.

2017

 
 
 
 
 
 
 
|-
| colspan="8" bgcolor="#E9E9E9"|
|-
 
 

 
 
 
 
 Source:

2012

 
 
 
 
 
 
|-
| colspan="8" bgcolor="#E9E9E9"|
|-

2007

2002

Sources

5